Artur Erwin Dziambor (born 27 January 1982 in Gdynia) is a Polish politician and teacher. He has been a vice-chairman of KORWiN and a deputy in the Sejm since 2019.

In 2019, he was elected to Sejm, starting from the Confederation Freedom and Independence list in the Słupsk constituency. He was a candidate in the 2019–20 Confederation presidential primary.
He is 1.96 m tall (6 ft 5 in).

In 2022, he was one of the 3 deputies of the Confederation Liberty and Independence who left the KORWiN coalition due to Korwin-Mikke's stance on Russia. Their new party is called Wolnościowcy (Libertarians).

References

External links
 https://konfederacja.net/prawybory/ 

Confederation Liberty and Independence politicians
Congress of the New Right politicians
Living people
People from Gdynia
Members of the Polish Sejm 2019–2023
1982 births